Deerskins may refer to:
Leather made from deer, see deerskin
The Deerskins, a television series